João Diogo Jennings (born 13 January 1999), commonly known as João Diogo, is a Brazilian footballer who plays as a forward for Aparecidense.

Career
João Diogo is a product of Cruzeiro Esporte Clube youth sportive system.

In August 2019 he signed a loan deal with the Ukrainian Premier League's Karpaty Lviv.

Personal life
On 26 September 2022, João Diogo and Botafogo-SP teammates Lucas Delgado and Dudu Hatamoto were accused of sexual assault in Rio de Janeiro. Delgado was released by the club two days later, while Dudu and João Diogo were punished by Botafogo.

References

External links
Profile at Zerozero 

1999 births
Living people
Sportspeople from Pará
Brazilian footballers
Association football forwards
Brazilian expatriate footballers
Campeonato Brasileiro Série B players
Campeonato Brasileiro Série C players
Ukrainian Premier League players
Figueirense FC players
Expatriate footballers in Ukraine
Brazilian expatriate sportspeople in Ukraine
FC Karpaty Lviv players
União Recreativa dos Trabalhadores players
Manaus Futebol Clube players
Associação Atlética Caldense players
Botafogo Futebol Clube (SP) players
Associação Atlética Aparecidense players